Townsen Creek is a stream in Iron County in the U.S. state of Missouri.

Townsen Creek derives its name from Bill , an early settler.

See also
List of rivers of Missouri

References

Rivers of Iron County, Missouri
Rivers of Missouri